Otívar is a municipality located at 267.80 metres above sea level in the Province of Granada, Spain. According to the 2004 census (INE), the village has a population of 1,113 inhabitants.

Agriculture is Otívar's predominant economic activity (mainly tropical fruit) however, due to the dramatic scenery of the surrounding mountains, a number of northern Europeans have discovered its charms and either take rural holidays here, or in a few cases have settled here and integrated with the local population.
The Sierras of Tejeda, Almijara and Alhama Natural Park are just west of the town.

Otívar contains a cross between a subtropical micro climate and a coastal mediterranean climate, creating a perfect environment for the famous "Níspero" known in English as the "loquat". The average yearly temperature is 14.80 °C (degrees Celsius). In the warmer months the average temperature is 28,80 °C (degrees Celsius) and in the colder months the average temperature is 4,50 °C (degrees Celsius).

The current mayor is Francisco Robles Carrascosa, from the political party of PP. This is the second consecutive term the mayor has won, after the PSOE´s defeat four years ago.

References

Municipalities in the Province of Granada